The Embassy of Indonesia, Kyiv is the diplomatic mission of the Republic of Indonesia to Ukraine and concurrently accredited to Armenia and Georgia. Diplomatic relations between Indonesia and Ukraine was established in June 1992. Indonesia had formally recognized Ukraine on 28 December 1991 after the dissolution of the Soviet Union.

Roni Hendrawan Kurniadi was the first ambassador of Indonesia to Ukraine in 1994. The current ambassador is Ghafur Akbar Dharmaputra who was appointed by President Joko Widodo on 17 November 2021.

See also 

 Indonesia–Ukraine relations
 List of diplomatic missions of Indonesia

Galeri

References 

Indonesia–Ukraine relations
Kyiv
Indonesia